Francis William Drum (3 January 1931 – 5 October 2018) was an Australian rules footballer who played with Richmond in the Victorian Football League (VFL).

References

External links 

1931 births
Australian rules footballers from Victoria (Australia)
Richmond Football Club players
Minyip Football Club players
2018 deaths